The West Raleigh Historic District in Raleigh, North Carolina is a national historic district listed on the National Register of Historic Places in 2003. Neighborhoods in the district include: Bedford Heights, Bagwell, Blue Moon Ridge, College Crest (now known as Stanhope), Fairmont, Forest Hills, Harris-Chamberlain, and Wilmont. Most homes in these neighborhoods are one-story and were constructed between the 1930s to 1950s. While the district is mostly residential, churches and commercial buildings are common along Hillsborough Street.

Enterprise Street, Chamberlain Street, and Rosemont Avenue form the eastern boundaries of the district. Mayview Road, Rosedale Avenue, Ruffin Street, and Furches Street form the northern boundary while Faircloth Street is the district's western boundary. Hillsborough Street forms the southern boundary, except from Dixie Trail to Henderson Street where the boundary moves southward to include the Stanhope neighborhood. Most of the district residents include faculty and students from North Carolina State University.

See also
List of Registered Historic Places in North Carolina

References

External links
Map of the West Raleigh Historic District
 National Register Historic Districts in Raleigh, North Carolina, RHDC
 West Raleigh Historic District, RHDC

Historic districts on the National Register of Historic Places in North Carolina
Colonial Revival architecture in North Carolina
Neighborhoods in Raleigh, North Carolina
National Register of Historic Places in Raleigh, North Carolina